Giedrė Barauskaitė (born in Vilnius, 23 October 1985) better known by her stage mononym GiedRé or Giedré (pronounced /ɡje.dʁe/), is a Lithuanian-born singer-songwriter comedian based in France.

Born in Lithuania, she moved with her mother to a Paris suburb after the death of her father when she was just seven. After her baccalauréat, she studied drama at Cours Florent and ENSATT (École nationale supérieure des arts et techniques du théâtre) and appeared in small roles in television, theatre, and advertisements. She composed a few songs and started performing them in a local bar in the early 2000s. Noticed by Raphaël Mezrahi during an audition, she opened for him at a show of his in La Cigale. She was invited a number of times to the Europe 1 show C'est quoi ce bordel? presented by Laurent Baffie. Using the stage name Moisie, she opened to Baffie shows for a month and a half, followed by opening for comedian Oldelaf. In 2011, she had her debut independent album release and appeared in Les Francofolies de La Rochelle and FrancoFolies de Montréal, Les Francofolies de Spa in Belgium became a laureat of Fonds d'action et d'initiative rock (FAIR) in 2012. She engaged on a local tour with 100 dates in two years. Wearing colourful folkloric clothes, her repertoire is full of politically incorrect, black humour, and controversial taboo subjects.

Discography

Albums

Singles

Filmography
 Best Intentions (2018)

References

External links
Official website

1985 births
Musicians from Vilnius
Living people
Lithuanian emigrants to France
21st-century Lithuanian women singers
Cours Florent alumni